Tristrophis rectifascia is a species of moth of the family Geometridae first described by Alfred Ernest Wileman in 1912. It is found in Taiwan.

Subspecies
Tristrophis rectifascia rectifascia
Tristrophis rectifascia asymetricaria (Oberthur, 1923)
Tristrophis rectifascia opisthommata Wehrli, 1923

References

Moths described in 1912
Ourapterygini